CSRE may refer to:

 Centre of Studies in Resources Engineering of the Indian Institute of Technology Bombay
 Certified Senior Broadcast Radio Engineer of the Society of Broadcast Engineers